The Embranchement de Châtillon is a branch of the Canal latéral à la Loire that connects to the Loire at Châtillon-sur-Loire.

See also
 List of canals in France

References

Chatillon